Dharmputra is a 1961 Hindi film directed by Yash Chopra based on a novel of the same name by Acharya Chatursen. This is Yash's second directorial venture. It was the first Hindi film to depict the partition of India, and Hindu fundamentalism. Produced by his elder brother B.R. Chopra, who was himself uprooted from Lahore, during the partition of India and established B.R. Films in Mumbai in 1956. The film dealt with issues of religious bigotry, fanaticism and communalism amidst the backdrop of the partition. Two years earlier, Yash Chopra had made his debut with Dhool Ka Phool (1959), steeped in Nehruvian secularism, wherein a Muslim brings up an "illegitimate" Hindu child and featured the classic song "Tu Hindu Banega Na Musalman Banega, Insaan Ki Aulaad Hai, Insaan Banega". The theme was reversed in this film as herein a Hindu family brings up an illegitimate Muslim child.

This was Shashi Kapoor's first film as an adult actor playing the pivotal role of a Hindu fundamentalist. Noted actor Rajendra Kumar made a special appearance for a song as did Shashikala. At the 9th National Film Awards it was awarded the Best Feature Film in Hindi.

Plot

The film opens in 1925, during the British rule in India and at the height of the Indian independence movement it is the tale of two Delhi families, that of Nawab Badruddin and Gulshan Rai. The two families are so close that they virtually share the same house. The Nawab's daughter, Husn Bano, has an affair with a young man named Javed and gets pregnant. When the Nawab attempts to arrange her marriage with Javed, he finds that Javed has disappeared. Amrit Rai and his wife Savitri assist Husn with the birth of a baby boy, Dilip, and even adopt him and give him their family name. Young Dilip is the apple of the Badruddin and the Rai households. Husn is then reunited and marries Javed. In the meantime, while participating in a protest to force the British to leave India, the Nawab is killed. Years later, Husn Bano and Javed return to a warm welcome by the Rai family. Then she meets Dilip - not the Dilip she had left behind - this Dilip is fascist, a Muslim-hater, who has joined forces with other extremists, in order to force Muslims to leave India and even go to the extent of burning buildings and killing them. How can Husn and Dilip adapt to each other with so much hate and distrust between them?

Cast 
 Shashi Kapoor as Dilip Rai
 Mala Sinha as Husn Bano
 Rehman as Javed
 Manmohan Krishna as Dr. Amrit Rai
 Indrani Mukherjee as Meena
 Tabassum as Rekha Rai
 Deven Verma as Sudesh Rai
 Nirupa Roy as Mrs. Savitri Amrit Rai
 Leela Chitnis as Meena's Mother
 Ashok Kumar as Nawab Badruddin (Husn Bano's Father)
 Rajendra Kumar as Party Leader
 Shashikala as Dancer

Soundtrack
The film's music was composed by N. Dutta with lyrics written by Sahir Ludhianvi. 

The song "Saare Jahan Se Achha", was written by poet Muhammad Iqbal.

Reception
The raw reconstruction of partition riots and sloganeering led to riot-like situations at theatres during screening the film, and the film flopped at the box office. After Dharmputras debacle, few directors ventured into the communal theme in Hindi cinema that took it so bluntly, the next film which dealt with the issue was Garm Hava, by M.S. Sathyu, made in 1973. The film's director Yash Chopra never made a political film again, and stuck to love stories till many decades later, when he touched the theme of religious harmony again with Veer Zaara (2004).

Awards 
National Film Awards
 1961: President's silver medal for Best Feature Film in Hindi
Filmfare Award
 1963: Best Dialogue: Akhtar ul Iman

See also
 List of Asian historical drama films

References

External links
 

1961 films
1960s Hindi-language films
Films directed by Yash Chopra
Yash Raj Films films
Films set in Delhi
Films set in the partition of India
Films scored by Datta Naik
Films based on Indian novels
Best Hindi Feature Film National Film Award winners